The S19 is a regional railway line of the S-Bahn Zürich on the Zürcher Verkehrsverbund (ZVV), Zürich transportation network.

Route 
 

The following stations are served:

 Koblenz
 
 
 
 
 
 
 
 
 Zürich Hauptbahnhof

Scheduling 
Between Dietikon and Effretikon, trains run every 30 minutes throughout the day. During the morning and evening peaks, a number of trains operate to and from Koblenz and Pfäffikon ZH. The journey time of the routes core between Dietikon and Effretikon is just over 30 minute. A through journey between Koblenz and Pfäffikon ZH takes around 80 minutes, although only a handful of trains per day permit such a journey.

Rolling stock 
 services are operated by Re 450 class or two (head and tail) modified Re 420 (LION) locomotives pushing or pulling double-deck passenger carriages.

History 
The route was introduced in the timetable revision of late 2015.

See also 

 Rail transport in Switzerland
 Trams in Zürich

References

External links 
 ZVV official website: Routes & zones

Zürich S-Bahn lines
Canton of Zürich
Aargau
Transport in the canton of Zürich